Now Is Everything is a 2019 Italian-American drama film directed by Valentina De Amicis and Riccardo Spinotti and starring Irakli Kvirikadze, Camille Rowe, Madeline Brewer and Anthony Hopkins.

Cast
Irakli Kvirikadze as Nicolas Yarna
Anthony Hopkins as Thomas
Camille Rowe as Matilda
Madeline Brewer as Hannah / Kate
Ray Nicholson as Cedric
Mickey Sumner as Caroline
Brad Greenquist as Detective
Rita Taggart as Jeanne
Juliette Labelle as Serena
Mariana Downing as Alice

References

External links
 

2019 films
English-language Italian films
American drama films
Italian drama films
2019 drama films
2010s English-language films
2010s American films